Kirstin Cairns (born 11 January 1963 in Isle of Bute) is a British former alpine skier who competed in the 1980 Winter Olympics and in the 1988 Winter Olympics.

References

External links
 

1963 births
Living people
People from the Isle of Bute
Scottish female alpine skiers
Olympic alpine skiers of Great Britain
Alpine skiers at the 1980 Winter Olympics
Alpine skiers at the 1988 Winter Olympics
Sportspeople from Argyll and Bute